Rakitnik is a village settlement south of Postojna in the Inner Carniola region of Slovenia.

The Postojna Airfield, sometimes also referred to as the Rakitnik Airfield, a grass-covered sports airfield, is located just north of the settlement.

Church

The local church is dedicated to the Betrothal of Mary and belongs to the Parish of Matenja Vas.

References

External links

Rakitnik on Geopedia

Populated places in the Municipality of Postojna